Choi Im-heon (born 13 January 1983) is a South Korean cross-country skier. He competed at the 2002 Winter Olympics and the 2006 Winter Olympics.

References

1983 births
Living people
South Korean male cross-country skiers
Olympic cross-country skiers of South Korea
Cross-country skiers at the 2002 Winter Olympics
Cross-country skiers at the 2006 Winter Olympics
Place of birth missing (living people)
Cross-country skiers at the 2003 Asian Winter Games
Cross-country skiers at the 2007 Asian Winter Games